A Man in a Hurry is a 2018 French comedy-drama film directed by Hervé Mimran.

Cast 
 Fabrice Luchini - Alain Wapler 
 Leïla Bekhti - Jeanne
 Rebecca Marder - Julia
  - Vincent

References

External links 

2018 comedy-drama films
French comedy-drama films
2010s French films